The golden parrotbill (Suthora verreauxi) is a species of parrotbill in the family Sylviidae. It is found in China, Laos, Japan, Myanmar, Taiwan, and Vietnam. Its natural habitat is subtropical or tropical moist montane forests. 

Its scientific name commemorates French ornithologist and collector Jules Verreaux.

References

 BirdLife International 2004.  Paradoxornis verreauxi.   2006 IUCN Red List of Threatened Species.   Downloaded on 26 July 2007.
Robson, C. (2007). Family Paradoxornithidae (Parrotbills) pp.  292–321 in; del Hoyo, J., Elliott, A. & Christie, D.A. eds. Handbook of the Birds of the World, Vol. 12. Picathartes to Tits and Chickadees. Lynx Edicions, Barcelona.

golden parrotbill
golden parrotbill
Birds of China
Birds of Laos
Birds of Taiwan
Birds of Yunnan
golden parrotbill
Taxonomy articles created by Polbot